This is a list of electoral results for the Electoral district of Flinders in South Australian state elections from the district's first election in 1938 until the present.

Members for Flinders

Election results

Elections in the 2020s

Elections in the 2010s

Elections in the 2000s

Elections in the 1990s

Elections in the 1980s

Elections in the 1970s

Elections in the 1960s

Elections in the 1950s

Elections in the 1940s

References

SA elections archive: Antony Green ABC
2002 SA election: Antony Green ABC
History of South Australian elections 1857-2006, volume 1

South Australian state electoral results by district